Michael Mörz (born 2 April 1980) is an Austrian professional footballer who currently plays for SV Schattendorf as a midfielder.

International career
He made his debut for Austria in a September 2005 World Cup qualification match against Azerbaijan but was not considered for the EURO 2008 squad. Until August 2008, he earned 12 caps, no goals scored.

External links
Roster - SV Mattersburg

1980 births
Living people
People from Eisenstadt
Austrian footballers
Austria international footballers
SV Mattersburg players
Austrian Football Bundesliga players
Association football midfielders
Footballers from Burgenland